Høgste Breakulen is the highest point on the Norwegian glacier Jostedalsbreen. It is inside the Jostedalsbreen National Park on the border of the municipalities of Stryn and Luster in Vestland county, Norway.

See also
List of mountains of Norway

References

External links
 http://www.westcoastpeaks.com/Peaks/hbreakulen.html

Mountains of Vestland
Stryn
Luster, Norway